The music of The Lord of the Rings film series, composed by Howard Shore to accompany Peter Jackson's films, exists in multiple recordings. It was heard by cinema audiences in the "theatrical" version, also released on DVD. Three single-disc albums were then released, forming briefer concert-pieces that broadly aligned with the narrative content of each film. Limited Deluxe CD versions contained additional bonus tracks. Extended versions of the films were released on DVD, with additional scenes and their accompanying music. A multi-disc set, The Complete Recordings, covered the entire score of the extended versions of the films on CD. A CD, The Rarities Archives, accompanied a 2010 book by Doug Adams. Finally, Shore edited The Lord of the Rings Symphony in six movements from the score, for concert performance.

Soloists 

For the three films Shore worked with many vocal and instrumental soloists.

Vocal
 Alto:
 Hilary Summers (contralto)
 Annie Lennox (light alto)
 Boy Soprano:
 Benedict "Ben" Del Maestro
 Edward Ross
 Blake Heslop-Charman
 Mezzo-Soprano
 Sheila Chandra
 Janet Roddick
 Enya
 Soprano
 Elizabeth Fraser
 Emilíana Torrini
 Sissel Kyrkjebø
 Isabel Bayrakdarian (lyrical soprano)
 Miriam Stockley (lyrical)
 Aivale Cole (née Mabel Faletolu; lyrical)
 Renée Fleming (operatic soprano)
Cast Performers
 Billy Boyd (Pippin) – tenor
 Viggo Mortensen (Aragorn) – baritone
 Miranda Otto (Éowyn) – mezzo-soprano
 Sir Ian Holm (Bilbo Baggins) – baritone
 Sir Ian McKellen (Gandalf) – baritone
 Liv Tyler (Arwen) – soprano
 Dominic Monaghan (Meriadoc "Merry" Brandybuck) – tenor
 Elijah Wood (Frodo) – tenor
 Andy Serkis (Smeagol) – baritone
 Sir Peter Jackson provided a tamtam hit when Aragorn enters Edoras
 Other actors like John Rhys-Davies (as Treebeard), Alan Howard (voice of the ring), Bernard Hill (Theoden) and Orlando Bloom (Legolas) recited verses or provided narration, without a melody.
Instrumental
 The "Elvish Impersonators": Jannet Roddick, David Donaldson, Stephen Roche ("Plan 9") and David Long: Fiddlek, Hurdy-Gurdy, Rommelpot, Jaw Harp, Harmonium, Whistle, Bodhran, Goblet Drum, Castanets, Tambourines, drones, Zither; possibly Dan Bau, Hasapi, Conga and Bongos
 Dermot Crehan – Fiddle, Sarangi, Hardanger fiddle, Double Fiddle
 Sir James Galway – flute, tin whistle, low whistle

 Ulrich Herkenhoff – pan flute
 Edward Cervenka – Hammered Dulcimer, cimbalom
 Mike Taylor: Tin Whistle, Low Whistle, Fiddle 
 Jan Hendrickse: Rhaita, Nay Flute 
 Sylvia Hallett: Sarangi, Dilruba
 Edward Hession: Musette
 Tracey Goldsmith: Musette
 Jean Kelly: Celtic Harp
 Greg Knowles: Dulcimer, Cimbalom
 John Parricelli: Six-String Guitar, Twelve-String Guitar
 Gillian Tingay: Celtic Harp 
 Sonia Slany: Monochord 
 Robert White: Drones/Bodhrán 
 Alan Doherty: Nay Flute, Tin Whistle
 Alan Kelly: Bodhrán

Original soundtracks 

Recordings of the score were originally issued on single-disc albums, that closely followed the theatrical release dates of the films or presented earlier versions recorded during the film's editing. The music on the disc was arranged as a concert-piece while also keeping reasonably with the plot progression of the film. Many of the cues are edited to create concert suites of some of the themes, such as the Ringwraith theme (in "Black Rider"), the Durin theme (in "Journey in the Dark"), the Rohan theme (in "Riders of Rohan"), and the Gondor theme (in "The White Tree").

All soundtrack albums of the trilogy have been released through Reprise Records, Enya's label at that time of the first soundtrack's release. While the cover art for The Fellowship of the Ring uses an original compilation of film characters, the covers for The Two Towers and The Return of the King reflect the respective film posters.

Limited Deluxe versions of the Original Soundtracks were also released, with bonus tracks covering "Farewell to Lorien" (from the Extended Edition) and the song "Use Well the Days", as well as a documentary (made by Shore's wife, Elizabeth Conotoir) following Shore's creation of the music and his work with the soloists and director.

The Complete Recordings 

Starting in 2005, a year after the extended release of The Return of the King, Reprise Records began to release one multi-disc set for each part of the trilogy. These annually published collections, titled The Complete Recordings, contain the entire score for the extended versions of the films on CD, along with an additional DVD-Audio disc that offers 2.0 stereo and 5.1 surround mixes of the soundtrack. Each album also comes with extensive liner notes by music journalist Doug Adams which reviews all of the tracks and provides information about the process of composing and recording the score, as well as a detailed list of all musical instruments, people and organizations involved. These Annotated Scores have been made freely available by New Line on the promotional website for the soundtracks (see below). The cover artwork uses common elements for the three albums like the film series' logo and an inscription in Tolkien's tengwar letters. The background of each album cover differs though in that it shows an aspect from the map of Middle-earth drawn by Christopher Tolkien that fits the title of the release and the location of the plot: The Fellowship of the Ring depicts the Shire, Rhudaur and Eregion in dark red, the cover for The Two Towers shows Rohan and Fangorn in dark blue while The Return of the King shows a map of Gondor in dark green.

In 2018, Rhino Entertainment re-released the Complete Recordings. The original CD box sets were re-released, with Blu-ray Audio discs replacing the DVD-Audio discs. The scores were also released on vinyl in limited edition, individually numbered sets. Additionally, the scores for The Fellowship of the Ring and The Two Towers were made available on digital download and streaming platforms for the first time.

The Fellowship of the Ring 

The Complete Recordings for The Fellowship of the Ring which unlike the other two albums, was conceived as an isolated film score, span just over three hours of music on three CDs. The set was released on 13 December 2005. It was re-released on CD/Blu-ray audio, vinyl, and digital platforms on 6 April 2018.

 Track listing

The Two Towers 

The Complete Recordings for The Two Towers span over three hours of music on three CDs. The set was released on 7 November 2006. It was re-released on CD/Blu-ray audio, vinyl, and digital platforms on 27 July 2018.

 Track listing

The Return of the King

The Complete Recordings for The Return of the King span almost 3 hours and 50 minutes on four CDs. The accompanying DVD-audio disc is double-sided to accommodate all of the material. The set was released on 20 November 2007 on CD/DVD-Audio and digital download. It was re-released on CD/Blu-ray audio and vinyl on 21 September 2018.

 Track listing

The Music of the Lord of the Rings Films 

The Music of the Lord of the Rings Films is a 2010 book by Doug Adams. The book contains a detailed look at the themes and leitmotives in the film's music, along with snippets of sheet music and illustrations, and a companion CD, The Rarities Archives.

The Rarities Archives

Symphony

Howard Shore reworked the music from the films and original soundtrack releases into movements for the concert hall, eventually creating the complete The Lord of the Rings Symphony, a more structured six-movement work for orchestra, choir and soloist. The suite has been performed in various concert halls around the world, accompanied by a light and visual art show by Alan Lee and John Howe. A DVD titled Howard Shore: Creating the Lord of the Rings Symphony—a composer's journey through Middle Earth has been released. The 50-minute-long DVD features extensive excerpts of the concert given by Shore and the Montreal Orchestra, Grand Choir and Children choir at the "Montreal en Lumiere" Festival, interspersed with spoken commentary by Shore, who recounts his approach in composing the music for the three films and then reworking it into the LOTR symphony. On 13 September 2011, Shore released "The Lord of the Rings Symphony" on CD and MP3 format. The double-album was recorded in Lucerne, Switzerland and performed by the 21st Century Symphony Orchestra & Chorus (including treble Loris Sikora, Boy Soprano Manuelle Polli, Mezzo-Soprano Kaitlyn Lusk and Bass-Baritone Marc-Olivier Oetterli) under the direction of Ludwig Wicki.

Track listing 

"Movement 1" – 11:25
 The Prophecy
 Concerning Hobbits
 The Seduction of the Ring
 The Black Rider and Treason of Isengard
"Movement 2" – 34:04
 Rivendell
 The Ring Goes South
 A Journey in the Dark
 The Bridge of Khazad Dum
 Lothlorien
 The Great River
 Amon Hen
 The Breaking of the Fellowship
"Movement 3" – 18:15
 Foundations of Stone/Glamdring
 Gollum
 Rohan
 The Black Gate Is Closed
 Evenstar
 The White Rider
 Treebeard
 The Forbidden Pool
"Movement 4" – 10:28
 The Hornburg
 Forth Eorlingas
 The Last March of the Ents
 Gollum's Song
"Movement 5" – 15:26
 Flight from Edoras
 Minas Tirith
 The Lighting of the Beacons
 The Steward of Gondor
 Cirith Ungol
 Anduril
"Movement 6" – 26:13
 The Fields of the Pelennor
 The Paths of the Dead
 The End of All Things
 The Return of the King
 The Grey Havens
 Into the West

Notes

References

External links 

 New Line's promotional website for the soundtracks
 Annotated Score for The Fellowship of the Ring
 Annotated Score for The Two Towers, archived from the original
 Annotated Score for The Return of the King, archived from the original
 Official website of Howard Shore
 Doug Adams's blog on the scores and his book, The Music of the Lord of the Rings Films
 List of CD releases for Lord of the Rings on Soundtrackguide.net
 Musical Themes in The Lord of the Rings by Eric Rawlins

Films scored by Howard Shore
The Lord of the Rings (film series) music
Classical music soundtracks
Howard Shore soundtracks